Salvia fruticosa, or Greek sage, is a perennial herb or sub-shrub native to the eastern Mediterranean,  including Southern Italy, the Canary Islands and North Africa. It is especially abundant in Israel and Lebanon.

Description
The entire plant is covered with hairs, with numerous leaves of various sizes growing in clusters, giving it a silvery and bushy appearance. In its native environment it grows as part of the Maquis shrubland and several other open plant communities, but populations composed entirely of Salvia fruticosa are not uncommon.

It is also grown as an ornamental flowering shrub, preferring full sun, well-draining soil, and good air circulation. Hardy to 20 degrees F., it is very drought resistant. The leaves have a high oil content, with some of the same chemicals as lavender.

Taxonomy
Due its wide variation in leaf shape, there has been a great deal of taxonomic confusion over the years, with many of the leaf variations of Salvia fruticosa being named as distinct species. These include S. libanotica, S. triloba, S. lobryana, and S. cypria, which are now considered to be Salvia fruticosa. The variation in leaf depends on geographical area, with plants growing on the western part of Crete having entire leaves with flat blade and margins and dark green upper sides. Plants growing on the eastern side of the island have much smaller leaves, with deeply three-lobed yellowish-green blade and undulate margins. The variation continues throughout different parts of Greece.

Adding to the confusion over the name, the plant has also been called Salvia triloba, as named by Carl Linnaeus in 1781, until it was discovered that it was the same as the plant named by Philip Miller in 1768, with the earlier name receiving preference according to plant naming conventions. Local names include sage apple, Khokh barri, and Na’ama Hobeiq’es-sedr.

Uses
It has a long tradition of use in Greece, where it is valued for its beauty, medicinal value, and culinary use, along with its sweet nectar and pollen. Salvia fruticosa was depicted in a Minoan fresco circa 1400 BCE at Knossos on the island of Crete. The ancient Phoenicians and Greeks likely introduced the plant for cultivation to the Iberian peninsula, with remnant populations of these introduced plants still found in some coastal areas.
Greek sage accounts for 50–95% of the dried sage sold in North America, and is grown commercially for its essential oil. It also has a long tradition of use in various Muslim rituals—for newborn children, at weddings, in funerals, and burnt as incense. A cross between S. fruticosa and Salvia officinalis developed in the middle east is called "silver leaf sage" or Salvia" Newe Ya'ar'", and is used in cooking.

In its native habitat, it frequently develops woolly galls about 1 inch in diameter which are called 'apples'. These 'apples' are peeled and eaten when they are soft, and are described as being fragrant, juicy, and tasty. The formation of galls was originally thought to be limited to Salvia pomifera, which led to the misidentification of many gall-bearing Salvia fruticosa plants. In 2001 it was discovered that the galls on Salvia fruticosa were caused by a previously undiscovered genus of Cynipid gall wasp.

References

External links
 

fruticosa
Flora of North Africa
Flora of Greece
Flora of Israel
Flora of Africa
Flora of the Canary Islands
Flora of Italy
Matorral shrubland
Flora of Palestine (region)
Eastern Mediterranean
Flora of Malta